The men's 3000 metres steeplechase event at the 2015 African Games was held on 13 September.

Results

References

3000